Smyrna Township is one of nineteen current townships in Pope County, Arkansas, USA. As of the 2010 census, its unincorporated population was 187. The township is a part of the Ozark National Forest.

Geography

Cities, towns, villages
Nogo

References
 United States Census Bureau 2008 TIGER/Line Shapefiles
 United States Board on Geographic Names (GNIS)
 United States National Atlas

External links
 US-Counties.com
 City-Data.com

Townships in Pope County, Arkansas
Townships in Arkansas